Days of Abandon is the third studio album by American indie pop band The Pains of Being Pure at Heart. It was released on May 13, 2014 by Yebo Music. The album was issued in Europe by Fierce Panda Records on June 2, 2014.

Critical reception

Under the Radar reviewer Austin Trunick found Days of Abandon to be reminiscent of "jangle-centric" 1980s music, "somewhere between The Smiths and The Cure's bouncier hits." Sasha Geffen of Consequence of Sound wrote that the album was "more deliberately articulated" than previous releases by The Pains of Being Pure at Heart, comparing its musical style to those of The New Pornographers and Interpol. In a joint review by 10 Sonic Seducer writers, the album was compared to the music of The Cure, The Smiths, and New Order, while also being criticized for being too shallow.

Track listing

Personnel
Credits are adapted from the album's liner notes.

The Pains of Being Pure at Heart
 Kip Berman – guitar, lead vocals
 Kurt Feldman – drums, percussion, synthesizer, programming, backing vocals
 Alex Naidus – bass

Additional musicians
 Jen Goma – lead vocals on "Kelly" and "Life After Life", backing vocals
 Kelly Pratt – horns
 Andy Savours – programming, additional synthesizer

Production
 Charlie Hugall – mixing
 Joe LaPorta – mastering
 Joe Rodgers – assistance (mixing)
 Andy Savours – production
 Danny Taylor – assistance (production)

Charts

References

External links
 

2014 albums
The Pains of Being Pure at Heart albums
Fierce Panda Records albums